Cagnet may refer to:

Jean-François Cagnet (1756–?), French gardener
Cagnet (airplane), designed by General Aircraft Ltd which flew from 1939 to 1941
Cagnet (band), US musicians whose song became popular in Japan